Inchlonaig is an island in Loch Lomond in Scotland.

Geography and geology 
Inchlonaig is the most northerly of the larger islands in the Loch Lomond, just south of where it narrows into a ribbon loch, and north of Inchconnachan.

History 
Inchlonaig has traces of human habitation dating back to 5000BC.

Scattered across the island are yew trees. The travel writer, H.V. Morton visited in the 1930s, and mentions:
Inchclonaig [sic], the 'marsh isle' whose yew trees, it is said, were planted by Robert the Bruce for his archers.
It is also stated that  King Robert used this supply to make bows before the fourteenth century Battle of Bannockburn. The island was thus of great value and the trees maintained with the utmost care.

Strathcashel, a stronghold of the Dukes of Montrose was opposite Inchlonaig.

Rob Roy fixed the amount of money he was to extort from Clan Colquhoun here.

At various times, the island has been a deer park, especially by Sir James Colquhoun in the 17th century and a place of confinement for drunkards and the mentally ill.

In 1873, Sir James Colquhoun, the clan chief, and some ghillies drowned after going hunting here, and they are buried together at Luss.

Current use

A stone cottage is now used as a holiday home. The island is classified by the National Records of Scotland as  an inhabited island that "had no usual residents at the time of either the 2001 or 2011 censuses."

The beaches on the island are also a common location for campers who are looking for a more quiet campsite.

See also 

 List of islands of Scotland

Footnotes

External links
 https://web.archive.org/web/20090710015304/http://lochlomond-islands.com/
article which mentions it

Lonaig
Sites of Special Scientific Interest in Scotland
Uninhabited islands of Argyll and Bute